"Stand by Me" is the Brilliant Green's fifteenth single, released on August 22, 2007. It peaked at #10 on the Oricon Singles Chart.

Track listing

References

2007 singles
2007 songs
Defstar Records singles
Songs written by Shunsaku Okuda
Songs written by Tomoko Kawase
The Brilliant Green songs